The 2004–05 season saw Hull City compete in Football League One where they finished in 2nd position with 86 points, gaining automatic promotion to the Championship.

Final league table

Results
Hull City's score comes first

Legend

Football League One

FA Cup

Football League Cup

Football League Trophy

Squad statistics

References

External links
 Hull City 2004–05 at Soccerbase.com (select relevant season from dropdown list)

Hull City A.F.C. seasons
Hull City
2000s in Kingston upon Hull